Valeria Straneo (born 5 April 1976) is an Italian long-distance runner, winner of the silver medal at the 2013 World Championships in Athletics and Italian record holder in the marathon.

She won the Stramilano in 2011 and bettered the half marathon Italian record at the Roma-Ostia Half Marathon in 2012, although it was not ratified as the course doesn't meet Fidal criteria.

Biography
Born in Alessandria, it was only after the removal of her spleen, in 2010, that she began to reach a national standard of running. At 35 years old, she ranked eighth in the 2011 Berlin Marathon with a time of 2:26:33 hours. This met the qualifying standard for the 2012 Olympic Games, but three other athletes had run faster than her (Anna Incerti, Rosaria Console and Nadia Ejjafini). However, she broke the 12-year-old Italian record at the Rotterdam Marathon in April, finishing as runner-up with a time of 2:23:44 hours. The Turin Marathon saw her finish third with a time of 2:27:04 hours.

Straneo has represented the Italy national athletics team once (at the 2011 European Cross Country Championships) and has won twice at the national championships. She has two children, Leonardo (born 2006) and Arianna (born 2007).

National records
Half marathon: 1:07:46 ( Ostia, 26 February 2012) - Current holder.
Marathon: 2:23:44 ( Rotterdam, 15 April 2012) - Current holder.

Achievements

Road races
1st - 2011 Stramilano 
2nd - 2012 Rotterdam Marathon

National titles
Straneo won eight national championships at individual senior level, she has won, at 36 years old for her first time, the individual national championship.

 Italian Athletics Championships
10,000 metres: 2013, 2020 (2)
Half marathon: 2012, 2014, 2018, 2020 (4)
 Italian 10 km road Championship
10 km road race: 2011, 2012 (2)

See also
Italian records in athletics
Italian all-time lists - Half marathon
Italian all-time lists - Marathon

References

External links
 

1976 births
Living people
Italian female long-distance runners
Italian female marathon runners
Athletes (track and field) at the 2012 Summer Olympics
Athletes (track and field) at the 2016 Summer Olympics
Olympic athletes of Italy
World Athletics Championships athletes for Italy
European Athletics Championships medalists
Mediterranean Games gold medalists for Italy
Athletes (track and field) at the 2013 Mediterranean Games
Mediterranean Games medalists in athletics
Italian Athletics Championships winners
20th-century Italian women
21st-century Italian women